Marco Antonio Firebaugh (October 13, 1966 – March 21, 2006) was a Democratic member of the California State Assembly from 1998 until 2004.

Early life and education 
Born in Tijuana, Baja California, Mexico, Firebaugh received a B.A. degree in political science from the University of California, Berkeley, and a J.D. degree from University of California, Los Angeles, School of Law.

Career 
Firebaugh was elected to the California State Assembly in 1998. In his final term in the Assembly, Firebaugh served concurrently as Assembly Majority Leader and Chairman of the California Latino Legislative Caucus.

Firebaugh had been seeking the Democratic nomination for a seat in the California State Senate, representing the 30th District.

Personal life 
Firebaugh was a resident of South Gate, California. He died from complications from a liver ailment with which he was diagnosed in 2003.

See also
Marco Antonio Firebaugh High School

References

External links
Join California Marco Antonio Firebaugh

1966 births
2006 deaths
American people of Mexican descent
American politicians of Mexican descent
Politicians from Tijuana
Hispanic and Latino American state legislators in California
Members of the California State Assembly
Mexican-American people in California politics
Mexican emigrants to the United States
University of California, Berkeley alumni
People from South Gate, California
Mexican people of German descent
20th-century American politicians
21st-century American politicians